The Castle Hotel at Taunton is a hotel with two restaurants, Castle Bow Restaurant and BRAZZ, located in the centre of Taunton, Somerset, England. The business is located in a Grade II listed 18th-century reconstruction of the former 12th-century Norman fortress, Taunton Castle.

Building

In 1685 the Duke of Monmouth used Taunton Castle as a base before his troop's defeat by King James II at Sedgemoor. Judge Jeffreys then held his Bloody Assizes in the Great Hall of the Castle.

The main building today, which was at one time known as Clarke's Hotel, was built in the late 18th century, and is Grade II listed. The building was then added in the 20th century, with a top floor addition.

The building incorporates Castle Bow a Grade I listed building which originally formed the east gate to the Castle precincts. It still has 13th century chamfered arches, and corner buttresses with setoffs.

Hotel and restaurant
The Chapman family have been running the hotel for more than 70 years. Catering is available in the hotel's signature restaurant, Castle Bow Restaurant and in BRAZZ brasserie. Head Chefs have included Christopher Oakes, Gary Rhodes, Phil Vickery. and Richard Guest. While Christopher Oakes was head chef the restaurant gained a Michelin star, but this was lost in 2008. The current head chef is Andrew Swann.

See also
 Grade I listed buildings in Taunton Deane

References

External links
 The Castle Hotel website
 Taunton Literary Festival 2013: Q&A with best-selling science writer, Marcus Chown
 The 50 Best British hotels

Houses completed in the 13th century
Houses completed in the 18th century
Buildings and structures in Taunton
Hotels in Somerset
Restaurants in Somerset
Grade I listed buildings in Taunton Deane
Grade II listed buildings in Taunton Deane
Grade I listed castles
Grade II listed hotels